Horodzhiv is a village (selo) in Lviv Raion, Lviv Oblast, of Western Ukraine. It belongs to Dobrosyn-Maheriv settlement hromada, one of the hromadas of Ukraine. The population of the village is about 1054 people. Local government is administered by Lavrykivska village council.

Until 18 July 2020, Horodzhiv belonged to Zhovkva Raion. The raion was abolished in July 2020 as part of the administrative reform of Ukraine, which reduced the number of raions of Lviv Oblast to seven. The area of Zhovkva Raion was merged into Lviv Raion.

Geography 
It is at a distance  on the west of the Highway M09 (Ukraine), which is part of the Warsaw – Lviv route.

Religious structures 
There are two churches in the village:
 The Assumption of the Blessed Virgin Mary Church (wood, 1733). 
 Church of St. Nicholas the Wonderworker.

Famous people 
Dmytro Sapiha – editor, journalist, director of the state enterprise "All-Ukrainian state multi-profile publishing house " KAMENIAR ".

References

External links 
 На широких просторах Равщини свої барви розкинуло мальовниче село Городжів 
  weather.in.ua /Horodzhiv, Zhovkva Raion
 Городжів. Церква Успіння Пр. Богородиці 1733 

Villages in Lviv Raion